Árnason (also Anglicised as Arnason) is a surname of Icelandic origin, meaning son of Árni. In proper Icelandic names, it would be written with the accent acute over the initial Á. In Icelandic names, it is not strictly a surname, but a patronymic. The name refers to:

Árni Már Árnason (born 1987), Icelandic swimmer
Árni Páll Árnason (born 1966), Icelandic politician
 Barbara Árnason (1911–1975), English-born Icelandic artist
 Chuck Arnason (born 1951), Canadian professional ice hockey player
 David Arnason (born 1940), Canadian author and poet
 Eleanor Arnason (born 1942), American author of science-fiction novels and short stories
 Garðar Árnason (born 1938), Icelandic footballer
 H. Harvard Arnason (1909–1986), American academic, administrator, author and art historian
 Hjalti Árnason (born 1963), Icelandic strongman competitor and powerlifter
 Hörður Árnason (born 1989), Icelandic football left back
 Jón Árnason (disambiguation), multiple people, including:
Jón Árnason (author) (1819–1888), Icelandic author
Jón Loftur Árnason (born 1960), Icelandic chess grandmaster
Jón Gunnar Árnason (1931–1989), Icelandic sculptor
 Kálfr Árnason (c.990–1051), Norwegian chieftain
 Kári Árnason (born 1982), Icelandic professional football player
 Kári Árnason (footballer, born 1944), Icelandic professional football player
 Mörður Árnason (born 1953), Icelandic politician
 Örn Árnason (born 1959), Icelandic actor, comedian and screenwriter
 Tómas Árnason (born 1923), Icelandic politician
 Tyler Arnason (born 1979), American professional ice hockey player
 Vilhjálmur Árnason (born 1953), Icelandic professor of philosophy, researcher in genetics, and author
 Þórólfur Árnason, Icelandic politician; mayor of Reykjavík 2003–04

See also
Arnarson, surname